Camonghne Felix (pronounced  ; born 1992) is an American writer, poet, and communications strategist. In 2015, she was appointed as Governor Andrew Cuomo's speechwriter, and was the first black woman and youngest person to serve in the role. Her debut poetry collection, Build Yourself A Boat, was longlisted for the 2019 National Book Award.

Career

Poetry 
Felix participated in the national slam poetry festival Brave New Voices and was featured in the festival's 2010 HBO series. She published her first chapbook, Yolk, in 2015. Her poetry was included in the 2018 anthology The Breakbeat Poets Volume 2: Black Girl Magic.

Her debut poetry collection Build Yourself A Boat was released in April 2019 by Haymarket Books. The poems cover topic such as sexual assault, abortion, and politics. Build Yourself A Boat received positive critical reviews. Ian Hogdson of South Side Weekly described it as "an impressive first collection, highlighting Felix’s unmistakable voice and impressive talent."

Glamour featured a poem Felix wrote and performed in honor of Breonna Taylor in the magazine's 2020 Women of the Year film.

Communications work 
Felix worked as the head of racial justice initiatives at Do Something in 2015. According to The Verge, she was fired after a meeting in which she suggested that the organization invest in Black communities after the murders of the Charleston Nine.

She previously worked as a senior manager of communications at Ms. In 2015, Felix was Gov. Andrew Cuomo's official speechwriter and was the first black woman and youngest person to hold the position. In 2019, Felix was the communications director for the campaign of Chicago mayoral candidate Amara Enyia. The next year, she was hired as the director of surrogates and strategic communications for Elizabeth Warren's 2020 presidential campaign. As of 2020 she is the vice president of strategic communications at Blue State, a digital strategy firm.

Personal life 
Felix was raised in The Bronx, New York. She received her masters of fine arts degree from Bard College, and is mentored by Mahogany L. Browne. She is queer.

Accolades 
 2019 - Out 100
2020 - Women of the Year Honoree, Glamour
For Build Yourself A Boat:
2019 - National Book Award For Poetry, Longlist nominee
2019 - 32nd Lambda Literary Awards, Bisexual Poetry, Nominee

References

External links 
Camonghne Felix on Poets.org
Camonghne Felix on Twitter

1992 births
Living people
21st-century African-American women writers
21st-century African-American writers
21st-century American poets
21st-century American women writers
21st-century LGBT people
African-American poets
American LGBT poets
American people of Caribbean descent
American political consultants
American women poets
Bard College alumni
LGBT African Americans
The New Yorker people
Queer women
Queer poets
Speechwriters
Writers from the Bronx